Fairview School may refer to:

Fairview School Building (Fairview, Arkansas), listed on the NRHP in Arkansas
Fairview School (Canton, Mississippi), listed on the NRHP in Mississippi
Fairview School (Meeker, Oklahoma), listed on the NRHP in Oklahoma
Fairview School (Centerville, Tennessee), formerly listed on the NRHP in Tennessee
Fairview International School, in Kuala Lumpur, Malaysia